Wayne Francis Connelly (born December 16, 1939) is a Canadian former ice hockey right winger who played in the National Hockey League with the Boston Bruins, Montreal Canadiens, Minnesota North Stars, Detroit Red Wings, St. Louis Blues, and Vancouver Canucks and finished his career in the World Hockey Association (WHA). Connelly was born in Rouyn, Quebec, and grew up in Teck, Ontario.

Playing career
Connelly played a total of 543 games in the NHL with 133 goals and 174 assists for a total of 307 points. In addition, he played 366 games in the WHA for the Minnesota Fighting Saints, Cleveland Crusaders, Calgary Cowboys, and Edmonton Oilers with 167 goals and 162 assists for 329 points.

Connelly won the Red Tilson Award in 1959–60 as the Ontario Hockey League's most outstanding player while with the Peterborough Petes. Connelly scored 235 points in 4 seasons with the Petes (1956–1960).

On November 29, 1961, Connelly scored his first NHL goal in Boston's 7-4 loss to the Chicago Blackhawks.  It occurred at Chicago Stadium.

On October 19, 1966, Bobby Orr recorded his first NHL point when he assisted on a powerplay goal by Connelly in Boston's 6–2 win over the Detroit Red Wings.

In the NHL's first year of expansion, 1967–68, Connelly led the Minnesota North Stars with 35 goals and 21 assists and received the Hockey News West Player of the Year award.

On April 9, 1968, Connelly became the first player to score a goal on a penalty shot in the NHL playoffs when he beat Los Angeles's Terry Sawchuk in a 7–5 victory for his Minnesota North Stars.

Personal life
Connelly and his wife Reg have two children, Ann and Stephen. He lives on Lake Kenogami located near Kirkland Lake in Northern Ontario.

Regular season and playoffs

External links
 

1939 births
Living people
Anglophone Quebec people
Boston Bruins players
Calgary Cowboys players
Canadian ice hockey right wingers
Cleveland Crusaders players
Detroit Red Wings players
Edmonton Oilers (WHA) players
Hull-Ottawa Canadiens players
Ice hockey people from Ontario
Ice hockey people from Quebec
Kingston Frontenacs (EPHL) players
Minnesota Fighting Saints players
Minnesota North Stars players
Montreal Canadiens players
Montreal Royals (EPHL) players
People from Rouyn-Noranda
Peterborough Petes (ice hockey) players
Sportspeople from Kirkland Lake
St. Louis Blues players
Vancouver Canucks players